is a Japanese musician, comedian, tarento and TV presenter. His talent agency is Yoshimoto Kogyo.

In the mid-1990s, Imada paired with the acclaimed Japanese record producer Towa Tei under the stage name Koji 1200. He released two albums and multiple hit singles, including Now Romantic and Blow Ya Mind.

Imada is currently one of the most prominent figures in the Japanese television industry as an active TV presenter and comedian. Although they were not an official comedy duo, Imada along with Koji Higashino were known as the W Koji as they shared the same name and were both graduates of the Yoshimoto NSC Osaka Comedy School as the 4th generation.

Media

Television

Present

Regular Programs
  (Nippon TV, 2012–)
  (TV Tokyo, 2011–) MC
  (ABCTV, 2008–) MC
   (NHK General TV, 2016–) MC
   (Nippon TV, 2008–) MC
   (Yomiuri TV, 2012–) MC
   (TBS, 2011–) MC
   (CBC TV, 2015–) MC
   (TV Tokyo, 2019–) MC
   (TV Asahi, 2019–) MC

Semi-regular Programs
   (Fuji TV, 2015–)

Discography

References

External links
 Yoshimoto Kogyo Official Profile
 Koji Imada – Official Website
 Koji Imada – NHK Person Profile
 

 

 

Japanese comedians
Japanese television presenters
People from Osaka
1966 births
Living people